Peter McGovern was a member of the Minnesota Senate.

Biography
McGovern was born on October 9, 1845 in Watertown, Wisconsin. He died on November 15, 1917 in Waseca, Minnesota. McGovern received his law degree from University of Wisconsin Law School and practiced law in Waseca, Minnesota.

Career
McGovern was a member of the Senate twice. First, from 1875 to 1876, and second, from 1899 to 1902.

References

People from Waseca, Minnesota
Politicians from Watertown, Wisconsin
University of Wisconsin Law School alumni
Minnesota lawyers
Minnesota state senators
1845 births
1917 deaths
19th-century American politicians
19th-century American lawyers